FC Sevastopol-2 was a Ukrainian football club. It is the second squad or Reserve team of FC Sevastopol. The club competed in the Ukrainian Second League football competition of Ukraine for the first time in 2008 but was withdrawn from the competition during the winter break.

Previously the Reserve club FC Sevastopol-2 competed in the Autonomous Republic of Crimea Football League and returned to that competition of 2009.

After the senior club was promoted to the Ukrainian Premier League the club was entered in the Reserves competition for the 2010–11 season.

Upon relegation from the Ukrainian Premier League the club entered the reserve team once again in the Druha Liha for 2011–12 season.

Honors

Krym Cup (Regional Cup)
  2008

League and cup history (Ukraine)

The club was founded in 2004 and played under the name of Alvita. The club competed in the Autonomous Crimean Football League.

{|class="wikitable"
|-bgcolor="#efefef"
! Season
! Div.
! Pos.
! Pl.
! W
! D
! L
! GS
! GA
! P
!Domestic Cup
!colspan=2|Europe
!Notes
|-bgcolor="PowderBlue"
|align=center|2008–09
|align=center|3rd Second League Gr. B
|align=center|18/18
|align=center|34
|align=center|2
|align=center|4
|align=center|28
|align=center|17
|align=center|39
|align=center|10
|align=center|
|align=center|
|align=center|
|align=center bgcolor=lightgrey|Withdrew
|-
|align=center|2009–10
|colspan="13" align=center| Club completes Autonomous Krym Oblast League
|-
|align=center|2010–11
|align=center|1st Reserves Premier League
|align=center|16/16
|align=center|30
|align=center|9
|align=center|2
|align=center|19
|align=center|36
|align=center|65
|align=center|29
|align=center|
|align=center|
|align=center|
|align=center bgcolor=pink|Relegated
|-bgcolor="PowderBlue"
|align=center|2011–12
|align=center|3rd Second League Gr. B
|align=center|10/14
|align=center|26
|align=center|7
|align=center|3
|align=center|16
|align=center|26
|align=center|51
|align=center|24
|align=center|
|align=center|
|align=center|
|align=center|
|-bgcolor="PowderBlue"
|align=center|2012–13
|align=center|3rd Second League Gr. B
|align=center|9/13
|align=center|24 	
|align=center|7 		
|align=center|2 	 		 	 	
|align=center|15 			
|align=center|25 	  	
|align=center|44  	  	
|align=center|23
|align=center|
|align=center|
|align=center|
|align=center bgcolor=lightgrey|Favbet (relegation) tournament Gr. 4 (5th); withdrew
|-
|align=center|2013–14
|align=center|1st Reserves Premier League
|align=center|10/16
|align=center|26
|align=center|10
|align=center|3
|align=center|13
|align=center|53
|align=center|61
|align=center|33
|align=center|
|align=center|
|align=center|
|align=center bgcolor=lightgrey|Expelled
|}

Notes and references

External links
 Official site

FC Sevastopol
Sevastopol-2
Sevastopol-2
Association football clubs established in 2008
Association football clubs disestablished in 2014
2008 establishments in Ukraine
2014 disestablishments in Ukraine